Suhail Warraich (born 8 November 1961) is a Pakistani journalist, television host, analyst and media personality. Warraich's  
most popular programme is Aik Din Geo Kay Sath on Geo News every Saturday and Sunday. He also shares his opinions on the talk show Meray Mutabiq along with host Maria Memon and on many other Pakistani television programs.

Early life and career
Warraich was born in Jauharabd , Khushab (a district in Punjab, Pakistan). He belongs to Warraich clan of the Jat community. Warraich holds a master's degree in English literature from the University of the Punjab. He has been affiliated with GEO TV since its inception and had started his career in journalism through print media in December 1985. He is one of the most popular host of the GEO TV Programmes Ek Din Geo k Sath, an interview-based TV program on lifestyles of celebrities. He also used to host Left Right, a political talk show posing right-wing and left-wing political arguments. Warraich used to support the left wing on this TV show. He used to  come on a programme Meray Mutabiq every Sunday, an opinionated interview/talk show based on Warraich's analytical views on current issues along with TV journalists Hassan Nisar and Iftikhar Ahmad. Sohail Warraich is also a human rights activist responsible for Amnesty International Pakistan's Human Rights Project.

Senior journalist and analyst Sohail Warraich joined Dunya News in capacity of Executive Director on 23 January 2017.
"Dunya Media Group announced the affiliation with the prominent media personality. The celebrated analyst took responsibility of Executive Director of Dunya News while performing duties as Group Editor at "Roznama Dunya". Suhail Warraich rejoined  Geo TV and currently is affiliated with Jang Group of Newspapers in 2020. One of the major Pakistani English-language newspapers describes him, "Sohail Warraich is one of the most well-known political reporters, interviewers who, having spent a lifetime in print, took to television like a duck to water".

Sohail Warraich is widely considered to be an authority on Punjab's political families, clans or 'biradari' system voting trend prevalent in Punjab's election politics.

Publications
He is also author of two books Ghaddar Kaun? and Qatil Kaun?. In his book Ghaddar Kaun (Who's the Traitor?), Sohail Warraich
writes about the facts that led to the coup d'état of 1999 in Pakistan and in the aftermath of the events on October 12, 1999. Former Prime Minister Mian Nawaz Sharif revealed many new facts about his life and political career in that interview and later included in Warraich's book. Sohail Warraich completed the book after almost three years of work. This book covers the entire life of Mian Nawaz Sharif, the former Prime Minister of Pakistan in 2017. In September 2020, his recent book titled Yeh Company Nahin Chale Gi (this company won't run) was removed from the bookstores in Pakistan due to objections on and reservations about a cartoon on its cover. According to Samaa TV News website, "The cartoon on the cover showed General Bajwa sitting in a chair and PM Khan sitting in his feet. The leaders of the opposition Nawaz Sharif, Asif Ali Zardari, Bilawal Bhutto Zardari and Maryam Nawaz were shown trying to look into the room from a window."

Journalism style
Warraich is known for his direct and blunt questioning style and sarcastic speaking tone and humour. His tag line 'Kia yeh khula tazzad nahin?' is very famous among the comedians and have been frequently repeated in several TV shows. He has conducted interviews with a
number of high-profile personalities and political figures and is given credit for his journalistic skills where he was able to extract interesting revelations from some prominent personalities of Pakistan.

Books
Qatil Kaun?
Ghaddar Kaun? (2006) (based on interviews when Nawaz Sharif was in exile in Saudi Arabia)
Gernailun Ki Siasat
Adalia Ke Uroojo Ki Kahani
Mazhabi Siasat Ke Tazadat
Chotay Soobay Punjab Se Naraz Keun
The Party is Over (2018) (inside stories of the disqualification of former Prime Minister Nawaz Sharif)

References

External links
 Watch Sohail Warraich's TV program 'Ek Din Geo k Sath'

1961 births
Living people
Pakistani television hosts
Pakistani male journalists
Geo News newsreaders and journalists
Punjabi people
People from Sargodha District
Central Model School, Lahore alumni
University of the Punjab alumni
Pakistani columnists